Gesico, Gèsigu in Sardinian language, is a comune (municipality) in the Province of South Sardinia in the Italian region Sardinia, located about  north of Cagliari.

Gesico borders the following municipalities: Escolca, Guamaggiore, Guasila, Mandas, Selegas, Suelli, Villanovafranca.

Demographic evolution

References 

Cities and towns in Sardinia